Mario Casacci (12 August 1925, in Pontedera – 8 July 1995, in Rome) was an Italian screenwriter. He is best known as the co-creator of the character of Lieutenant Sheridan, who was played on the small screen by the actor Ubaldo Lay. Casacci's co-creator was his colleague Alberto Ciambricco In 1959, he also co-created, again with Ciambricco, the television program Giallo club.

Selected filmography

Television 

 1959-1961: Giallo club. Invito al poliziesco
 1963: Ritorna il tenente Sheridan
 1968-1973: I ragazzi di padre Tobia

Film 

 1966: Rojo

References

External links 
 

1925 births
1995 deaths
Italian television writers
Male television writers
People from Pontedera
20th-century Italian screenwriters
Italian male screenwriters
20th-century Italian male writers